The Standard Commands for Programmable Instruments (SCPI; often pronounced "skippy") defines a standard for syntax and commands to use in controlling programmable test and measurement devices, such as automatic test equipment and electronic test equipment.

Overview 
SCPI was defined as an additional layer on top of the  specification "Standard Codes, Formats, Protocols, and Common Commands". The standard specifies a common syntax, command structure, and data formats, to be used with all instruments. It introduced generic commands (such as CONFigure and MEASure) that could be used with any instrument. These commands are grouped into subsystems. SCPI also defines several classes of instruments. For example, any controllable power supply would implement the same DCPSUPPLY base functionality class. Instrument classes specify which subsystems they implement, as well as any instrument-specific features.

The physical hardware communications link is not defined by SCPI. While it was originally created for the IEEE-488.1 (GPIB) bus, SCPI can also be used with RS-232, RS-422, Ethernet, USB, VXIbus, HiSLIP, etc.

SCPI commands are ASCII textual strings, which are sent to the instrument over the physical layer (e.g., IEEE-488.1). Commands are a series of one or more keywords, many of which take parameters. In the specification, keywords are written CONFigure: The entire keyword can be used, or it can be abbreviated to just the uppercase portion. Responses to query commands are typically ASCII strings. However, for bulk data, binary formats can be used.

The SCPI specification consists of four volumes: Volume 1: "Syntax and Style", Volume 2: "Command Reference", Volume 3: "Data Interchange Format", Volume 4: "Instrument Classes".  The specification was originally released as non-free printed manuals, then later as a free PDF file.

SCPI history
First released in 1990, SCPI originated as an additional layer for IEEE-488. IEEE-488.1 specified the physical and electrical bus, and IEEE-488.2 specified protocol and data format, but neither specified instrument commands. Different manufacturers, and even different models, of the same type of instrument would use different command sets. SCPI created a standard which could be common across all manufacturers and models. It requires use of the IEEE-488.2 data formats, but does not mandate the IEEE-488.1 bus.

In 2002-2003, the SCPI Consortium voted to become part of the IVI Foundation (Interchangeable Virtual Instruments).

IEEE 488.2 history
In 1987, IEEE introduced IEEE 488.2-1987 specification "Standard Codes, Formats, Protocols, and Common Commands", it was later revised in 1992 as IEEE 488.2-1992.

While IEEE 488.2 provided a device-independent syntax, there was still no standard for instrument-specific commands. Commands to control the same class of instrument, e.g., multimeters, would vary between manufacturers and even models.  The United States Air Force, and later Hewlett-Packard, recognized this problem. In 1989, HP developed their TML language which was the forerunner to SCPI.

The IEC developed their own standards in parallel with the IEEE, with IEC 60625-2-1993 (IEC 625).  In 2004, the IEEE and IEC combined their respective standards into a "dual logo" IEEE/IEC standard IEC 60488-2-2004, Part 2: Codes, Formats, Protocols and Common Commands, replaces IEEE 488.2-1992 and IEC 60625-2-1993.

Command syntax 
SCPI commands to an instrument may either perform a set operation (e.g. switching a power supply on) or a query operation (e.g. reading a voltage).  Queries are issued to an instrument by appending a question-mark to the end of a command.  Some commands can be used for both setting and querying an instrument.  For example, the data-acquisition mode of an instrument could be set by using the ACQuire:MODe command or it could be queried by using the ACQuire:MODe? command.  Some commands can both set and query an instrument at once.  For example, the *CAL? command runs a self-calibration routine on some equipment, and then returns the results of the calibration.

Similar commands are grouped into a hierarchy or "tree" structure.  For example, any instruction to read a measurement from an instrument will begin with "MEASure".  Specific sub-commands within the hierarchy are nested with a colon character.  For example, the command to "Measure a DC voltage" would take the form MEASure:VOLTage:DC?, and the command to "Measure an AC current" would take the form MEASure:CURRent:AC?.

    :MEASure
        :VOLTage
             :DC?
             :AC?
        :CURRent
             :DC?
             :AC?
               ...

Abbreviating commands
The command syntax shows some characters in a mixture of upper and lower case. Abbreviating the command to only sending the upper case has the same meaning as sending the upper and lower case command.

For example, the command “SYSTem:COMMunicate:SERial:BAUD 2400” would set an RS-232 serial communications interface to 2400 bit/s. This could also alternatively be abbreviated “SYST:COMM:SER:BAUD 2400”. The query command “SYSTem:COMMunicate:SERial:BAUD?” or “SYST:COMM:SER:BAUD?” would instruct the instrument to report its current baud rate.

Concatenating commands 
Multiple commands can be issued to an instrument in a single string. They are made of simple commands separated by a semicolon character. For example, the command to "Measure a DC voltage then measure an AC current" would be issued as MEASure:VOLTage:DC?;:MEASure:CURRent:AC?.

Simple commands which start with a colon are interpreted with respect to the root of the command tree. Otherwise, they refer implicitly to the last node of the previous command (unless they already begin with an asterisk). For example,

    :SOURce:FREQuency:STARt 100;STOP 200

is a shorthand for the message

    :SOURce:FREQuency:STARt 100;:SOURce:FREQuency:STOP 200

Arguments
Some commands require an additional argument.  Arguments are given after the command, and are separated by a space.  For example, the command to set the trigger mode of an instrument to "normal" may be given as "TRIGger:MODe NORMal".  Here, the word "NORMal" is used as the argument to the "TRIGger:MODe" command.

Integer arguments
For commands that accept integer arguments, values may be specified in multiple computer number formats: decimal, hexadecimal, octal, binary.  The last three formats are defined by IEEE 488.2, which SCPI is based upon.  Decimal numbers (radix 10) aren't prefixed, hexadecimal numbers (radix 16) are prefixed with #H or #h, octal numbers (radix 8) with #Q or #q, and binary numbers (radix 2) with #B or #b.  Hexadecimal digits may use either uppercase letters (ABCDEF), or lowercase letters (abcdef), or mixed case letters (aBcDeF).  For octal, the letter "Q" was chosen instead of the letter "O" to minimize the visual confusion with the number "0" (zero).

The following argument examples are numerically equivalent:
 Decimal: 26
 Hexadecimal: #H1A or #h1a
 Octal: #Q32 or #q32
 Binary: #B11010 or #b11010

See also 
 IEEE-488 (GPIB)
 Virtual Instrument Software Architecture (VISA)
 Instrument driver
 List of TCP and UDP port numbers - scpi-raw on TCP port 5025 and UDP port 5025

References

External links

, official website
Specifications
SCPI-1999 Specification, Volume 1-4, free, 819 page PDF file.
IEEE 488.2-1992 Specification, USD$44 cost, available as PDF file.
IEEE/IEC 60488-2-2004 Specification, USD$332 cost, available as PDF file.
Test Equipment SCPI Examples
Keysight InfiniiVision 2000 X-Series Oscilloscopes Programmer's Guide, 938 page PDF file.

Electronic engineering
Electronics standards
Input/output
Electronic test equipment